In molecular biology, the protein domain, YTH refers to a member of the YTH family that has been shown to selectively remove transcripts of meiosis-specific genes expressed in mitotic cells.

This protein domain, the YTH-domain, is conserved across all eukaryotes and suggests that the conserved C-terminal region plays a critical role in relaying the cytosolic Ca-signals to the nucleus, thereby regulating gene expression.

Function/mechanism
It has been speculated that in higher eukaryotic YTH-family members may be involved in similar mechanisms to suppress gene regulation during gametogenesis or general silencing. The rat protein YT521-B, SWISSPROT, is a tyrosine-phosphorylated nuclear protein, that interacts with the nuclear transcriptosomal component scaffold attachment factor B, and the 68kDa Src substrate associated during mitosis, Sam68. In vivo splicing assays demonstrated that YT521-B modulates alternative splice site selection in a concentration-dependent manner. Additionally, it is also thought that YTH domain has a role in RNA binding.

Structure
The domain is predicted to be a mixed alpha/beta-fold containing four alpha helices and six beta strands.

Plant
In plant cells environmental stimuli, which light, pathogens, hormones, and abiotic stresses, elicit changes in the cytosolic calcium levels but little is known of the cytosolic-nuclear Ca-signaling pathway; where gene regulation occurs to respond appropriately to the stress. It has been demonstrated that two novel Arabidopsis thaliana (Mouse-ear cress) proteins, (ECT1 and ECT2), specifically associated with Calcineurin B-Like-Interacting Protein Kinase1 (CIPK1), a member of Ser/Thr protein kinases that interact with the calcineurin B-like Ca-binding proteins. These two proteins contain a very similar C-terminal region (180 amino acids in length, 81% similarity), which is required and sufficient for both interaction with CIPK1 and translocation to the nucleus.

References

Protein domains